Brigadier General A C Chemaly  was a General Officer in the South African Army.

Early life
Brigadier Chemaly matriculated from Queen's College and went on to graduate from Royal Military Academy Sandhurst.

Civilian career
As a Reserve Force Officer, Brigadier Chemaly also had a civilian career. He was a well known businessman in the Queenstown area.

Retirement
Brigadier Chemaly retired from active service in 2008/9, but remained active in the post of Honorary Colonel of the First City Regiment.

Awards
Brig Gen Chemaly has received the following awards during his career:

Medals and decorations

Proficiency Awards

Notes

References

South African Army generals
South African military officers
South African people of Lebanese descent
People from Queenstown, South Africa
Graduates of the Royal Military Academy Sandhurst
2016 deaths